Helena Lehtinen (born 1952) is a Finnish contemporary jeweller and teacher.

Lehtinen was born in Lahti and spent her childhood in Nastola, Finland. After studying silversmithing in Lahti University of Applied Science from 1973 to 1977 she travelled to Norway and Germany where she became familiar with works of the Swiss jeweller Otto Kûnzli which made profound impact on her later choices.

Together with Tarja Tuupanen and Eija Mustonen she formed Hibernate group in 1999. In 2000 she graduated with the designer degree from Lahti Polytechnic. She was teaching in Konstfack, Stockholm as a senior lecturer from 2004 to 2006 and facilitated courses at the South Carelia Polytechnics, Lappeenranta and at the Goldsmith School, Lahti. In 2013 she received an international Herbert Hoffman Prize and Finnish Jewellery Art Association awarded her Jewellery Artist of the Year in 2015.

Helena Lehtinen was exhibiting extensively all her live and her work is in public collections of Design Museum Helsinki, Danner Foundation, Munich (on permanent loan to Die Neue Sammlung - The International Design Museum, Munich, Germany) and Gallery Marzee in the Netherlands.

Her jewellery is being described as diverse and surprising. “In her oeuvre we find traces of Minimalism, although her works are never simpler cold. (…) Lehtinen’s oeuvre is characterised by her pieces, but never boring, compositions which we are able to witness in her series.”  She gets her inspiration from small everyday objects and works with wood, metals and recyclable materials.

She considers jewellery to be an art piece that can be interpreted and given meaning by the owner. Lehtinen also believes that media play an important role in promoting design, and jewellery design in particular, amongst general public.

References

Sources
 Helena Lehtinen
 Archived copy 
 From the Coolest Corner – Nordic Jewellery, editor Widar Halén, p. 92

Finnish designers
1952 births
Living people
Women jewellers